The 2018 Rafa Nadal Open Banc Sabadell was a professional tennis tournament played on hard courts. It was the first edition of the tournament which was part of the 2018 ATP Challenger Tour. It took place in Manacor, Spain between 28 August – 2 September 2018.

Singles main-draw entrants

Seeds

 1 Rankings are as of 20 August 2018.

Other entrants
The following players received wildcards into the singles main draw:
  Alejandro Davidovich Fokina
  Emilio Gómez
  Nicola Kuhn
  Roberto Ortega Olmedo

The following players received entry into the singles main draw as alternates:
  Pedro Cachín
  Dan Evans
  Mario Vilella Martínez
  James Ward

The following players received entry from the qualifying draw:
  Enzo Couacaud
  Teymuraz Gabashvili
  Tobias Simon
  Tim van Rijthoven

The following player received entry as a lucky loser:
  João Menezes

Champions

Singles

  Bernard Tomic def.  Matthias Bachinger 4–6, 6–3, 7–6(7–3).

Doubles

  Ariel Behar /  Enrique López Pérez def.  Dan Evans /  Gerard Granollers walkover.

References

2018 ATP Challenger Tour